Euchlaena muzaria, the muzaria euchlaena moth, is a species of moth of the  family Geometridae. It is found in North America, where it has been recorded from Florida, Kentucky, Maine, Maryland, Massachusetts, Minnesota, New Brunswick, New Hampshire, New York, North Carolina, Ohio, Ontario, South Carolina and Tennessee.

The wingspan is 27–48 mm. The wings are purplish brown with tiny dark discal spots. There are one or two generations per year with adults on wing from April to August.

The larvae feed on Prunus serotina and Prunus virginiana.

References

Moths described in 1860
Angeronini